Kimbeflu Evanda Mack (born October 29, 1961) is a former American football cornerback who played in one game for the Seattle Seahawks. He was a replacement player. He went to college at Florida State.

References

External links
 Kim Mack – nolefan.org

1961 births
Florida State Seminoles football players
American football cornerbacks
Seattle Seahawks players
Living people